Jiří Veselý was the defending champion but chose not to defend his title.

Sebastian Korda won the title after defeating Ramkumar Ramanathan 6–4, 6–4 in the final.

Seeds

Draw

Finals

Top half

Bottom half

References

External links
Main draw
Qualifying draw

2020 ATP Challenger Tour
2020 Singles